Robert Erwin Thoft (July 13, 1929 – February 8, 2009) was an American politician who served as a Republican member of the Montana House of Representatives from 1979 to 1993.

References

External links
 

1929 births
2009 deaths
Republican Party members of the Montana House of Representatives
20th-century American politicians